Xorides is a genus of ichneumon wasps in the family Ichneumonidae. There are at least 150 described species in Xorides.

See also
 List of Xorides species

References

Further reading

External links

 

Xoridinae